The secondary highway system is a lower-level classification of state highway maintained by the Montana Department of Transportation (MDT) in the US state of Montana. Secondary highways first appeared on the state highway map in 1960, even though the secondary system was established in 1942. With very few exceptions, notably MT 287 and the former MT 789, Montana state highways numbered 201 and higher are secondary highways.

The highway markers for Montana's secondary highways are distinctive in that the route number appears in black on a white downward-pointing arrowhead. Early markers were white numbers on black arrowheads with the word Montana in the flat top of the inverted arrowhead and Secondary appearing below the route number on the shields.



List of highways

Secondary Highway 206

Secondary Highway 206 (S-206) is a  secondary state highway in Flathead County, Montana connecting Montana Highway 35 (MT 35) east of Evergreen to U.S. Highway 2 (US 2) east of Columbia Falls.

S-206 begins at the junction with MT 35 and runs almost due north to its terminus with US 2 east of Columbia Falls, providing a rural bypass for traffic headed to Glacier National Park, Kalispell, Bigfork and Polson.

S-206 passes through mostly rural landscape, and wildlife crossings should be expected at all times as animals search for food and water.

Today's S-206 was part of the original 1926 US 2 corridor from Kalispell to Columbia Falls (along with MT 35 from the S-206 southern terminus to Evergreen). This two-lane paved road was initially built in 1934 and last improved in 2011 as listed in the state road log.

The S-206 designation has existed since at least 1960 when S-206 was LaSalle Road, an  four-lane highway that connected US 2 in Evergreen to MT 40 west of Columbia Falls and provides access to Glacier Park International Airport. It was route swapped from LaSalle Road in 1983 (as seen in the 1985 state map), and the former routing is now part of US 2 from junction P-52 (MT 35) to junction N-38 (MT 40).

Secondary Highway 232 

S-232 turns northwest where it terminates the Wild Horse Border Crossing at the Canadian border, continuing north as Alberta Highway 41 towards Medicine Hat.

S-232 is a combined urban and secondary route, with Corridor C000232 comprises 7th Avenue and 5th Street North within Havre, connecting S-232 with U.S. Highway 2 (US 2).

Secondary Highway 317

Secondary Highway 317 (S-317) is a  secondary state highway in Flathead County, Montana, connecting Kalispell and Evergreen.

S-317 begins at the "Four Corners" junction with Cemetery Road to the west and U.S. Highway 93 (US 93) and Lower Valley Road south of the city limits of Kalispell. It proceeds north on Willow Glen Drive, then north and east on Conrad Drive along the Stillwater River, and north on Shady Lane to its terminus at State Highway 35 (MT 35). It is a de facto southeast bypass of downtown Kalispell for traffic headed to Evergreen and places such as Glacier National Park and Bigfork.

S-317 passes through mostly rural landscape outside the Kalispell city limits, and wildlife crossings should be expected at all times as animals go to the river for water and search for food.

S-317 is a paved two-lane highway entirely within the Kalispell urban area. As such, it is signed as a secondary route (corridor C000317) but listed as an urban route (U-6734) in the road log.

Secondary Highway 323

Secondary Highway 323 (S‑323) is a  secondary state highway in eastern Carter County, Montana, that connects Alzada and Ekalaka.

S‑323 begins at the U.S. Route 212 (US 212) in the unincorporated community of Alzada near the Montana-Wyoming state line. S‑323 travels north from Alzada through eastern Carter County. At  S‑323 reaches its northern terminus at the southern terminus of Montana Highway 7 in Ekalaka.

S‑323 is a paved two-lane highway its entire length.

Secondary Highway 326

Secondary Highway 326 (S-326) is a secondary state highway in the extreme south part of Carter County, Montana.

S-326 begins at Wyoming Highway 112 (WYO 112) at the Montana–Wyoming state line. Located here is a historical marker for Camp Devin. The highway then travels north  to end at US Route 212 (US 212) in Alzada.

Secondary Highway 391

Secondary Highway 391 (S-391) is a secondary state highway in the southern half of Powder River County, Montana, although it is a non-paved gravel road.

S-391 begins at the Montana–Wyoming state line in Powder River County. The gravel highway then travels north  to an end at US Route 212 (US 212) in Broadus.

Secondary Highway 419

Secondary Highway 419 (S-419) is a secondary state highway between Montana Highway 78 to the Stillwater Mining Company near Nye. The David Thatcher Memorial Highway is an  highway that begins at the intersection of MT  78 and MT 419 south of Absarokee and runs through Fishtail and Nye. It was named in honor of World War II veteran and Montana native Sergeant David Thatcher, who enlisted in the United States Army Air Corps in December 1940. Thatcher was one of the Doolittle Raiders and a recipient of the Silver Star. On March 20, 2019, Governor Steve Bullock signed into law Montana Senate Bill 175, which named the section of highway.

Secondary Highway 424

Secondary Highway 424 (S-424), also known as Three Mile Drive and Farm to Market Road, is a  secondary state highway in Flathead County, Montana, connecting northwestern Kalispell to U.S. Route 93 (US 93) west of Whitefish.

S-424 begins at the junction of North Meridian Road and Three Mile Drive in Kalispell, just south of US 93 and just north of US 2. It follows Three Mile Drive west past the Kalispell Middle School to an interchange with the new US 93 Alternate before curving north and west as Farm to Market Road (subsuming sections of Springcreek Road and Four Mile Drive). S-424 proceeds mostly north from here, passing the West Valley Elementary School at the intersection with S-548, entering a forested area, going north on Lodgepole Road and then going east and north on Twin Bridges Road to its northern terminus at US 93 west of Whitefish, near Spencer Lake.

S-424 passes through mostly rural and forest landscape between Kalispell and Whitefish and wildlife crossings should be expected at all times as animals search for food and water.

S-424 is a paved two-lane road throughout. In the state road log, S-424 is a combined urban and secondary route, but is only currently signed outside the Kalispell city limits. Corridor C000424 comprises U-6706 (Three Mile Drive/Farm to Market Road) and S-424.

Farm to Market Road can be seen on the 1935 map as an all-weather gravel road.

The 1960 map was the first to use the S-424 route designation, where state highways were shown with square shields and the new numbered state roads (the secondary highways) were shown with oval shields.

Some map products still show the original S-424 routing, which continued on Farm to Market Road to the west terminus of, and including the entirety of, Twin Bridges Road. This routing provided access to Tally Lake Road and various U.S. Forest Service sites therein. The section of Farm to Market between Tally Lake and Twin Bridges Roads, even though paved, is much narrower and has more sudden curves than is preferred for modern driving. This prompted the route shift to Lodgepole Road between Farm to Market and Twin Bridges Roads. Lodgepole Road is a much wider county road built in 1956, and improved to paved state highway standards in 2003 expressly for this purpose.

Farm to Market Road continues north, providing access to the Twin Lakes area before intersecting with US 93 north of milepost 139.

Secondary Highway 486

Secondary Highway 486 (S-486), also known as the North Fork Flathead Road (NFFR), is a  secondary state highway in Flathead County, Montana, that connects the city of Columbia Falls with the Glacier National Park at Camas Road.

S-486 begins at the junction with U.S. Highway 2 (US 2) in Columbia Falls. It follows Nucleus Avenue north through downtown, turning northeast at Railroad Street (the truck route used by logging trucks coming from the north). It spends the next  winding its way through the Flathead National Forest until it reaches its officially signed terminus at Camas Road, which leads to the western entrance of Glacier National Park.

The highway passes through mostly forest landscape north of Columbia Falls, and wildlife crossings should be expected at all times as animals search for food and water.

S-486 is a two-lane road paved for the first  and mostly gravel the rest of the way. It is listed in the state road log as a combined urban and secondary route. Corridor C000486 comprises U-2501 (Nucleus Avenue/Railroad Street/North Fork Road) and S-486. The oldest section remaining in the current road was constructed by Flathead County in 1945, and the road has been signed as a state secondary highway since at least 1971.

Even though NFFR runs north from Columbia Falls to Canada, the S-486 designation (and the state funding that goes with it) currently stops at Camas Road. Flathead County is responsible for maintaining the gravel portion of S-486 and all construction and maintenance on the rest of the road that parallels the North Fork Flathead River to Polebridge (the northwestern entrance to Glacier National Park) and on to the Canadian border.

In August 2010, Flathead County and Montana Department of Transportation completed a study of the NFFR to evaluate corridor issues for the road such as dust pollution that carries into Glacier National Park. Because the NFFR is also Forest Highway 61, additional federal funding could be tapped for any reconstruction projects. With pending bridge replacement on US 2 near Hungry Horse scheduled for 2017, Columbia Falls city officials and residents are once again calling for paving the NFFR to Camas Road, at minimum, to give Glacier National Park visitors an alternate route to detour around the construction.

Secondary Highway 487

Secondary Highway 487 (S-487), also known as Big Mountain Road, is a  secondary state highway in Flathead County, Montana connecting the city of Whitefish to the Whitefish Mountain Resort at Big Mountain.

S-487 begins at the junction with U.S. Highway 93 (US 93, 2nd Street) in Whitefish. It follows Baker Avenue, turning into Wisconsin Avenue when it crosses the BNSF railroad tracks west of the historic Amtrak station. S-487 turns west on Lakeshore Drive, before turning north onto Big Mountain Road and winding its way up to the Whitefish Mountain Resort at Big Mountain.

S-487 passes through mostly rural and forest landscape north of Whitefish, and wildlife crossings should be expected at all times as animals search for food and water.

S-487 is a paved two-lane road throughout, and is listed in the state road log as a combined urban and secondary route. Corridor C000487 comprises U-12001 (Baker Avenue/Wisconsin Avenue/Lakeshore Drive/Big Mountain Road) and S-487. Big Mountain Road was created in 1947 when the ski resort was established, and has been signed as a state secondary route since at least 1963.

Secondary Highway 503

Secondary Highway 503 (S-503) is a  secondary state highway in Flathead County serving Foys Lake and Foys Canyon residents southwest of Kalispell.

S-503 begins at the junction with U.S. Highway 2 (US 2) and Meridian Road. It follows Meridian Road south to the southwest corner of the city limits of Kalispell. It meets the new US 93 Alternate at a roundabout, and proceeds west and southward on Foys Lake Road along Foys Lake and providing access to the Lone Pine State Park before heading southeast into Foys Canyon. S-503 turns north and emerges from the canyon at Rocky Cliff Drive and continues northward as Airport Road to its second roundabout with US 93 Alternate and passes the Kalispell city airport before reaching its terminus at US 93 and 13th Street East.

S-503 passes through mostly rural landscape outside the Kalispell city limits, and wildlife crossings should be expected at all times as animals search for food and water.

S-503 is now a paved two-lane road throughout, with the former gravel segment through Foys Canyon finally being reconstructed to paved state highway standards in 2002 to reduce dust pollution in the valley. In the state road log, S-503 is a combined urban and secondary route, but is only currently signed outside the Kalispell city limits. Corridor C000503 comprises U-6713 (Meridian Road), S-503, and U-6730 (Airport Road).

Secondary Highway 508

Secondary Highway 508 (S-508) is a secondary highway in far northwestern Montana. It begins at a junction with State Highway 37 (MT 37) and heads north-northeast to the town of Yaak where it ends at S-567. It is also known as Yaak River Road, and is located completely within Lincoln County.

Secondary Highway 537

Secondary Highway 537 (S-537) is a secondary highway in northeast Montana. It begins at a junction with U.S. Highway 2 (US 2) and heads north out of the town of Hinsdale where it turns into Hinsdale North Road as it heads towards the Canadian Border. It is located completely within Valley County.

Secondary Highway 548

Secondary Highway 548 (S-548), also known as West Reserve Drive and Old Reserve Drive, is a  secondary state highway in Flathead County, Montana connecting S-424 across the northern rural areas of Kalispell to U.S. Highway 2 (US 2) in Evergreen.

S-548 begins at the junction with S-424 and McMannamy Draw. It proceeds east as Old Reserve Drive across rolling and flat terrain. It reaches Stillwater Road and passes Glacier High School before meeting the new US 93 Alternate and joining it for its last half mile (0.8 km) to US 93. Now under its original name, West Reserve Drive, S-548 proceeds east across the Stillwater River, intersects with Whitefish Stage Road, descends a hill, and crosses the Whitefish River before reaching its terminus at US 2 in Evergreen.

S-548 passes through mostly rural landscape outside the Kalispell city limits, and wildlife crossings should be expected at all times as animals search for food and water.

Prior to the realignment caused by the US 93 Alt. construction, S-548 was known throughout as West Reserve Drive, based on Evergreen's east/west divider at LaSalle Road (today's US 2).

S-548 is a paved two-lane road throughout, except for the four-lane segment where it is overlaid on US 93 Alt. and across US 93 east to Hutton Ranch Road. In the state road log, S-548 is a combined urban and secondary route. Corridor C000548 comprises S-548 and U-6737 (West Reserve Drive/Old Reserve Drive/Reserve Place).

Past US 2, East Reserve Drive (urban route U-6708) extends another  to Helena Flats Road (U-6712) before coming totally under county construction, funding, and maintenance. East Reserve and Helena Flats provide a de facto rural bypass from north Evergreen, connecting the terminus of S-548 east and south to Montana Highway 35 (MT 35).

See also

References

 S
Secondary